Lanham is an unincorporated community in Putnam County, West Virginia, United States. It is part of the Charleston metropolitan area.

References 

Unincorporated communities in Putnam County, West Virginia
Unincorporated communities in West Virginia
Charleston, West Virginia metropolitan area

vo:Confidence (West Virginia)